Teen Mom: The Next Chapter  is an American reality television series broadcast by MTV. It premiered on September 6, 2022.

Cast 
 Amber Portwood
 Ashley Jones
 Briana DeJesus
 Catelynn Baltierra
 Cheyenne Floyd
 Jade Cline
 Leah Messer
 Maci McKinney

Episodes

Season 1 (2022)

References

External links 
 

2020s American reality television series
American television spin-offs
English-language television shows
Teenage pregnancy in television
MTV reality television series
Reality television spin-offs
Television series about teenagers